Cindy Guntly Memorial Airport , originally Hunt Field, is a privately owned public use airport located  northwest of the central business district of Franksville, a neighborhood of the village of Caledonia, in Racine County, Wisconsin, United States.

Although most U.S. airports use the same three-letter location identifier for the FAA and IATA, this airport is assigned 62C by the FAA but has no designation from the IATA.

The airport is named in honor of the owner's wife, Cindy Guntly, who was involved in a fatal car accident in 1986.

Facilities and aircraft 
It has two runways: 1/19 is 2,425 by 70 feet (739 x 21 m) with a turf surface; 18/36 is 1,200 by 80 feet (366 x 24 m), also with a turf surface.

For the 12-month period ending June 2, 2022, the airport had 6,700 aircraft operations: all general aviation.
In January 2023, there were 34 aircraft based at this airport: 30 single-engine, 1 helicopter and 3 ultra-light.

See also
List of airports in Wisconsin

References

External links 
 

Airports in Wisconsin
Buildings and structures in Racine County, Wisconsin
Airports in Racine County, Wisconsin